See also List of United States Army Air Forces reconnaissance units for F-10 Mitchell reconnaissance groups
This is a list of United States Army Air Forces B-25 Mitchell medium bomber units.  It does not include non-combat units assigned within the United States for operational training or replacement training.

The B-25 medium bomber was one the most famous airplanes of World War II. It was the type used by Gen. Jimmy Doolittle for the famous Doolittle Raid over Japan on 18 April 1942.

The first B-25 test aircraft flew on 19 August 1940, and the first production Mitchell was delivered to the 17th Bombardment Group in February 1941.  A total of 9,816 Mitchells were built, greater than any other American twin-engined bomber. The majority of B-25s in American service were used in the Pacific Theater of Operations (PTO) and the Aleutian Campaign.   In the China-Burma-India Theater (CBI), the B-25 attacked Japanese communication links, especially bridges in central Burma. It also helped to supply the besieged troops at Imphal in 1944.

In 1942, the first B-25Bs arrived in Egypt just in time to take part in the Battle of El Alamein. From there the aircraft took part in the rest of the Western Desert Campaign, the invasion of Sicily and the advance up Italy. The five bombardment groups that used the B-25 in the North African desert and the Mediterranean Theater of Operations (MTO) were the only US units to use the B-25 in Europe. In addition to the bombardment groups, the F-10 photographic reconnaissance variant of the Mitchell was widely used.

After the war, the B-25 was taken out of front-line service and redesignated the TB-25, reflecting that it was no longer considered a combat aircraft.  It flew training roles with the United States Air Force for many years, the last example, TB-25J 44-30210 not being retired until 31 January 1959.

Units

 3d Bombardment Group
 Fifth Air Force (SW Pacific), 1942-1944
 Australia, New Guinea,  Netherlands East Indies,  Philippines
 8th Bombardment Squadron
 13th Bombardment Squadron
 90th Bombardment Squadron
 Transitioned to A-20 Havoc, late 1944

 12th Bombardment Group
 Ninth Air Force (Middle East), 1942-1943
 Twelfth Air Force (MTO), 1943-1944
 Tenth Air Force (CBI), 1944-1945
 Egypt, Libya, Tunisia, Sicily, Italy, India
 81st Bombardment Squadron
 82d Bombardment Squadron
 83d Bombardment Squadron
 434th Bombardment Squadron
 Inactivated in India, 1945

 17th Bombardment Group
 Doolittle Raid
 Second Air Force (ZI/CONUS), 1941-1942
 Oregon, South Carolina
 34th Bombardment Squadron
 37th Bombardment Squadron
 89th Reconnaissance Squadron
 95th Bombardment Squadron
 Doolittle Raider volunteers chosen from all 4 squadrons.
 Transitioned to B-26 Marauder, June 1942

 22d Bombardment Group
 Fifth Air Force (SW Pacific), 1942-1944
 Australia, New Guinea, Philippines
 2d Bombardment Squadron
 18th Bombardment Squadron
 19th Bombardment Squadron
 33d Bombardment Squadron
 Transitioned to B-24 Liberator, Jan 1944

 28th Bombardment Group
 Eleventh Air Force (Aleutian Campaign), 1941-1945
 Alaska Territory
 37th Bombardment Squadron
 37th Bombardment Squadron
 406th Bombardment Squadron
 Inactivated Oct 1945

 38th Bombardment Group
 Fifth Air Force (SW Pacific), 1942-1945
 Australia, New Guinea,  Netherlands East Indies,  Philippines
 71st Bombardment Squadron
 405th Bombardment Squadron
 822d Bombardment Squadron
 823d Bombardment Squadron
 Transitioned to A-26 Invader, Sep 1945

 41st Bombardment Group
 Seventh Air Force (Central Pacific), 1943-1946
 Tarawa, Gilbert Islands, Okinawa
 47th Bombardment Squadron
 48th Bombardment Squadron
 396th Bombardment Squadron
 820th Bombardment Squadron
 Inactivated Jan 1946

 42d Bombardment Group
 Thirteenth Air Force (South Pacific), 1943-1946
 Solomon Islands, Netherlands East Indies,  Philippines
 69th Bombardment Squadron
 70th Bombardment Squadron
 75th Bombardment Squadron
 100th Bombardment Squadron
 390th Bombardment Squadron
 Inactivated May 1946

 310th Bombardment Group
 Twelfth Air Force (North Africa), 1942-1943
 Fifteenth Air Force (MTO), 1943-1945
 Morocco, Algeria, Tunisia, Corsica, Italy
 379th Bombardment Squadron
 380th Bombardment Squadron
 381st Bombardment Squadron
 428th Bombardment Squadron
 Inactivated Sep 1945

 319th Bombardment Group
 Twelfth Air Force (North Africa) (MTO), 1944-1945
 Corsica
 437th Bombardment Squadron
 438th Bombardment Squadron
 439th Bombardment Squadron
 440th Bombardment Squadron
 Replaced by A-26 Invader

 321st Bombardment Group
 Twelfth Air Force (North Africa) (MTO), 1943-1945
 Algeria, Tunisia, Italy
 445th Bombardment Squadron
 446th Bombardment Squadron
 447th Bombardment Squadron
 448th Bombardment Squadron
 Inactivated Sep 1945

 340th Bombardment Group
 Ninth Air Force (Middle East), 1942-1943
 Twelfth Air Force (MTO). 1943-1945
 Egypt, Libya, Tunisia, Sicily, Italy
 486th Bombardment Squadron
 487th Bombardment Squadron
 488th Bombardment Squadron
 489th Bombardment Squadron
 Inactivated Nov 1945

 341st Bombardment Group
 Tenth Air Force (CBI), 1942-43
 Fourteenth Air Force (CBI), 1944-1945
 India, China
 11th Bombardment Squadron
 22d Bombardment Squadron
 490th Bombardment Squadron
 491st Bombardment Squadron
 Inactivated Nov 1945

 345th Bombardment Group
 Fifth Air Force (SW Pacific), 1942-1945
 New Guinea, Netherlands East Indies,  Philippines
 498th Bombardment Squadron
 499th Bombardment Squadron
 500th Bombardment Squadron
 501st Bombardment Squadron
 Inactivated Dec 1945

References

 Maurer, Maurer (1983). Air Force Combat Units Of World War II. Maxwell AFB, AL: Office of Air Force History. .
 
 Pace, 2002, B-25 Mitchell Units of the MTO, Osprey Publishing, 

Mitchell
Lists of military units and formations of World War II
United States Army Air Forces lists
United States in World War II-related lists